Baghel Singh (c. 1730 – c. 1802) was a Military general in the Punjab region in the northern part of the Indian subcontinent in the 18th century. He rose to prominence in the area around Sutlej and Yamuna. Singh joined the Singh Krora Misl, one of the misls during Sikh Confederacy. In 1765, Singh became the leader of the misl.

Early life 

Baghel Singh was born in village Jhabal Kalan, Amritsar District of Punjab around 1730s into a Dhaliwal Jat family. He was the descendant of Chaudhary Bhai Langaha, the Sikh chief of 84 villages in the Majha, who along with his younger brother Bhai Pero Shah the grandfather of the Mai Bhago, had converted to Sikhism, during the time of Guru Arjan Dev, in the 1580s.

From humble beginnings he arose to become a formidable force in the area between River Sutlej and River Yamuna. He aligned himself with Karor Singhia misl led by Sardar Karora Singh. After the early demise of Karora Singh, Bhai Baghel Singh succeeded as a leader of Karora Singhia misl in 1765. He is celebrated in Sikh history as the vanquisher of Mughal Delhi. On the 11th of March 1783, the Sikhs entered the Red Fort in Delhi and occupied the Diwan-i-Am (Hall of Public Audience), where the Mughal Emperor, Shah Alam II, made a settlement with them that allowed Baghel Singh to raise Gurdwaras on Sikh historical sites and allowed them to take six annas of each rupee (of all the Octrai duties) and any other taxes collected by the Mughal state (equal to 37.5 %).

Baghel Singh set up camp in the Sabzi Mandi area of Delhi, with 4000 troops, taking charge of the police station in Chandani Chowk. He located seven sites connected with the lives of the Sikh Gurus and had shrines raised on the sites within the space of eight months (April to December 1783). Gurdwara Sis Ganj marked the spot in the main Mughal street of Chandani Chowk where Guru Tegh Bahadur had been executed at the orders of Aurangzeb and Gurdwara Rakab Ganj Sahib, near the modern day Parliament House, where the Guru's body was cremated. Bangla Sahib and Bala Sahib were dedicated to the memory of the Eight Guru, Guru Har Krishan. Four other Gurdwaras Gurdwara Majnu ka Tilla, Moti Bagh, Telivara and Gurdwara Nanak Piao were also constructed during this period.

Background 

Guru Gobind Singh while leaving for Nanded in Southern part of India, divided the Sikhs into 12 misls and broadly allocated their areas of operation. Whereas these misls operated independently in their own areas under the respective misldars, together they constituted Dal Khalsa under the leadership of Jassa Singh Ahluwalia. Sikhs had been making incursions outside Punjab and restricting the influence of the Mughal leaders. It is narrated that the Sikhs had levied ‘Rakhi’ and ‘Kambli’ taxes as far as Saharanpur, Hardwar and beyond.

Karora Singhia misl had 12,000 fighting men according to Syed Ahmad Latif, a Muslim historian. As well as being a good soldier, Baghel Singh was a very good political negotiator and was able to win over many an adversary to his side. The Mughals, the Ruhilas, the Marathas and British sought his friendship. In the wake of decay of Mughal authority in the Punjab owing to Ahmad Shah Durrani's successive invasions during the latter half of the eighteenth century, the Sikhs began extending their influence.

Baghel Singh's KarorSinghia misl fought head on with Ahmad Shah Durrani (also known as Abdali), along with other Dal Khalsa Misls near Kup at Malerkotla, where in one day of battle alone 30-40000 of women, children and old Sikhs were martyred. After Durrani's invasion, Sikhs started consolidating the territories between Yamuna and Indus by incorporating into Misls and misls reporting to Chief of Dal Khalsa, Jassa Singh Ahluwalia about territory won at Akal Takht Amritsar.

Whereas Sukarchakia misal (of Ranjit Singh) won the territory of Gujranwala, and other areas of Ravi and Chenab Doab and Ramgarhia Misal won the areas of Amritsar, Gurdaspur, Bhangi around Lahore and Kasur, Karor Singhia misal declared their ownership of territories now including Ambala, Karnal, Hissar, Rohtak, Chandigarh, etc. Baghel Singh took possession of portions of the Jalandhar Doab and established himself at Hariana, near Hoshiarpur. Soon after the Sikh conquest of Sirhind in 1764, he extended his arms beyond Karnal and occupied number of villages including Chhalaudi which he later made his headquarters.

Then Baghel Singh turned his attention towards the cis-Yamuna territories. Soon the Sikhs also won territories beyond Delhi and beyond, including Meerut, Awadh, collecting tribute from the Nawabs of each area.

Military career
Singh was a skilled political negotiator, able to create alliances with former enemies.

On disintegration of the Mughal Empire in the second half of the 18th century, due to Afghan incursions under the Pashtun leader, Ahmad Shah Durrani (Abdali), Sikh influence in the north of India increased. Singh's unit fought with Ahmad Shah Durrani against Mughal forces at Malerkotla. The Singh Krora Misl took Ambala, Karnal, Thanesar, and Hissar. Singh took possession of part of the Jalandhar Doab and established himself at Hariana, near Hoshiarpur.

Soon after the Sikh conquest of Sirhind in 1764, Singh extended his rule beyond Karnal and occupied a number of villages including Chhalaudi which became Singh's new headquarters. Singh further expanded his territory into the Cis-Sutlej states including Meerut, Saharanpur, Shahdra and Awadh. His actions were supported by Afghan allies including Zabita Khan and Ghulam Kadir.

Attack on Delhi
In February 1764, an army of 30,000 Sikh soldiers under the command of warrior leaders including Singh, crossed the Yamuna River and captured Saharanpur. They overran the territory of Najib ud-Daulah, acquiring from him a tribute of eleven lakh of rupees ( 1,100,000).

In April 1775, Singh with two other sardars, Rai Singh Bhangi and Tara Singh Ghaiba, crossed the Yamuna river to occupy land ruled by Zabita Khan, the son and successor of Najib-Ud-Daulah. In desperation, Zabita Khan offered Singh large sums of money and proposed an alliance to jointly plunder the crown lands.

Singh set up an Octroi post (taxation office) near Sabzi Mandi to collect tax on goods imported into the city. The money was used for the construction of Sikh Gurdwara's.

In March 1776, the Sikhs defeated the forces of the Mughal emperor Shah Alam II near Muzaffarnagar.

Battle of Ghanaur

In 1778, Shah Alam II sent an army of about 10,000 soldiers in a counter-attack against the Sikhs. The Mughal force was led by the Wazir Mirza Najaf Khan (Nawab Majad-Ud-Daula) under the banner of the crown prince. The Mughal forces and the Sikh forces met in battle at Ghanaur, near Patiala. The Mughal army lost the battle and surrendered.

Rise of Sikh power
In 1783, Singh entered Delhi.

Singh and the Mughal Emperor contracted that 12.5% of the "octroi" (trade tax) of Delhi would be sent to Singh. In return, he would ensure that the Sikhs did not attack the capital again.

Sikh Gurdwaras in Delhi
Singh is credited with establishing several Gurudwaras (Sikh Gurdwara's) in Delhi, including:
 Gurdwara Mata Sundri
 Gurdwara Bangla Sahib
 Gurdwara Rakab Ganj
 Gurdwara Sis Ganj
 Gurdwara Majnu Ka Tilla

Death
Singh died in about 1802 in Hariana in Hoshiarpur district of Punjab, India.

See also
Guru Tegh Bahadur
Nawab Kapur Singh

References

Further reading
 Gian Singh, Giani, Panth Prakash [Reprint]. Patiala, 1970
 Bhahgu, Ratan Singh, Prachin Panth Prakash [Reprint], Amritsar, 1962
 Sital, Sohan Singh, Sikh Mislan. Ludhiana, 1952
 Harbans Singh, The Heritage of the Sikhs. Delhi, 1983

External links
 News article on Baghel Singh 
 The Fall of the Moghul Empire of Hindustan

1730s births
1800s deaths
Indian Sikhs
People from Amritsar district
Sikh warriors